The House of Lunin are several aristocratic families from Russia.

References
 
 

Russian noble families